Dzemidovich is a gender-neutral Belarusian surname that may refer to
Alyaksandr Dzemidovich (born 1989), Belarusian football player
Barys Dzemidovich (1906–1977), Belarusian mathematician
Vadzim Dzemidovich (born 1985), Belarusian football player

Belarusian-language surnames